Loners Are Cool is the second extended play by Australian rap artist Allday. It was released in April 2013 and peaked at number 18 on the ARIA Charts. The EP was certified gold in Australia in 2019.

Track listing

Charts

Release history

Certifications

References

2013 EPs
Allday albums
EPs by Australian artists